"Down Came a Blackbird" is a song recorded by American country music artist Lila McCann.  It was released in May 1997 as her debut single and the first from her album Lila. The song reached number 28 on the Billboard Hot Country Singles & Tracks chart.  The song was written by Micheal Smotherman and Mark Spiro.

Content
The song is about a troubled relationship, using a blackbird as a metaphor.

Critical reception
The then-president of Asylum Records said of the song at its release that the song "is starting to look like 'Blue' all over again" but added that "We're hoping radio won't kill this before it has a chance to be a hit".

Chart performance

References

1997 debut singles
1997 songs
Lila McCann songs
Songs written by Micheal Smotherman
Songs written by Mark Spiro
Asylum Records singles
Songs about birds